Bezirk Wiener Neustadt-Land is a district of the state of Lower Austria in Austria.

Municipalities
Suburbs, hamlets and other subdivisions of a municipality are indicated in small characters.
 Bad Erlach
Brunn bei Pitten, Erlach, Linsberg
 Bad Fischau-Brunn
Bad Fischau, Brunn an der Schneebergbahn
 Bad Schönau
Almen, Bad Schönau, Leitenviertel, Maierhöfen, Schlägen, Schützenkasten, Wenigreith
 Bromberg
Breitenbuch, Bromberg, Schlag, Schlag, Schlatten
 Ebenfurth
Ebenfurth, Großmittel, Haschendorf
 Eggendorf
 Felixdorf
 Gutenstein
Gutenstein, Hintergschaid, Klostertal, Längapiesting, Steinapiesting, Urgersbach, Vorderbruck, Zellenbach
 Hochneukirchen-Gschaidt
Burgerschlag, Grametschlag, Gschaidt, Harmannsdorf, Hattmannsdorf, Hochneukirchen, Kirchschlagl, Loipersdorf, Maltern, Offenegg, Ulrichsdorf, Züggen
 Hochwolkersdorf
Hackbichl, Hochwolkersdorf-Dorf, Hochwolkersdorf-Zerstreut, Rosenbrunn
 Hohe Wand
Gaaden, Maiersdorf, Netting, Stollhof
 Hollenthon
Blumau, Gleichenbach, Grohdorf, Hollenthon, Horndorf, Lehen, Michelbach, Mittereck, Obereck, Pürahöfen, Spratzau, Spratzeck, Stickelberg, Untereck
 Katzelsdorf
 Kirchschlag in der Buckligen Welt
Aigen, Kirchschlag in der Buckligen Welt, Lembach, Stang, Straß, Thomasdorf, Ungerbach
 Krumbach
Krumbach-Amt, Krumbach-Markt
 Lanzenkirchen
Frohsdorf, Haderswörth, Kleinwolkersdorf, Lanzenkirchen, Ofenbach
 Lichtenegg
 Lichtenwörth
Amlos, Feichten, Kaltenberg, Kühbach, Lichtenegg, Maierhöfen, Pengersdorf, Pesendorf, Pregart, Pregart, Pürahöfen, Purgstall, Ransdorf, Schlagergraben, Spratzau, Tafern, Thal, Tiefenbach, Wäschau, Wieden, Winkl
 Markt Piesting
Dreistetten, Markt Piesting
 Matzendorf-Hölles
Hölles, Matzendorf
 Miesenbach
 Muggendorf
Kreuth, Muggendorf, Thal
 Pernitz
Feichtenbach, Pernitz
 Rohr im Gebirge
 Schwarzenbach
Schwarzenbach, Schwarzenbach-Zerstreut
 Sollenau
 Theresienfeld
 Waidmannsfeld
Neusiedl, Schallhof, Waidmannsfeld
 Waldegg
Dürnbach, Ober-Piesting, Oed, Peisching, Reichental, Waldegg, Wopfing
 Walpersbach
Klingfurth, Schleinz, Schleinz, Walpersbach
 Weikersdorf am Steinfelde
 Wiesmath
 Winzendorf-Muthmannsdorf
Emmerberg, Muthmannsdorf, Winzendorf
 Wöllersdorf-Steinabrückl
Steinabrückl, Wöllersdorf
 Zillingdorf
Zillingdorf, Zillingdorf-Bergwerk

External links

 
Districts of Lower Austria